The 554 Anatolia earthquake took place on August 15, 554 in the southwest coasts of Anatolia (Asia Minor). It affected the Güllük Gulf (Mandalya Gulf), and the island of Kos.

The main sources on the earthquake are the works of historians John Malalas (6th century), Agathias (6th century), Theophanes the Confessor (9th century), and George Kedrenos (11th century).

The earthquake severely damaged the city of Tralles (modern Aydın), the island of Kos as well as the island of Kalymnos. An area of 8.5 km2 of the land was cut off from the main island of Kalymnos forming the island known nowadays as Telendos. Lesser damages were reported from the cities of Nicomedia (modern İzmit) and Antioch (modern Antakya). The earthquake was reportedly felt as far as Constantinople (modern Istanbul), and areas of the Middle East. 

The earthquake caused a seismic sea wave (tsunami) which reportedly flooded many coastal areas in southern Anatolia. The historian Agathias visited the island of Kos shortly after the earthquake. He reported that the tsunami demolished whatever buildings had been left standing in the island's main city following the earthquake. 

The Corpus Scriptorum Historiae Byzantinae (1828–1897) mentions several other earthquakes for the year 554. The earthquakes shook Anatolia, the  Arabian Peninsula, Mesopotamia, Palestine. The cities of Alexandria, Beirut, and Constantinople reportedly suffered damages from these earthquakes. The vast area affected suggests multiple earthquakes over a relatively short period of time. 

The main earthquake is dated to 554, but the historian Carolus Sigonius (16th century) estimated that the event occurred in either 555 or 556.

References

General

Specific

554
550s in the Byzantine Empire
6th-century earthquakes
Kos
Medieval Anatolia
Earthquakes in the Byzantine Empire